Cochylimorpha chionella is a species of moth of the family Tortricidae. It is found in Iraq.

References

Moths described in 1924
Cochylimorpha
Moths of Asia